Stanton Earl Mitchell (August 17, 1944 — January 24, 2012) was an American football fullback who played in the National Football League. Mitchell played college football at Tennessee.

Early life and high school
Mitchell was born in Wayne, Michigan and grew up in Sparta, Tennessee and attended White County High School.

College career
Mitchell was a three year starter at fullback for the Tennessee Volunteers. He led the team in rushing as a junior in 1964 with 325 yards. He finished his collegiate career with 1,266 rushing yards and 10 touchdowns.

Professional career
Mitchell was selected in the eighth round of the 1966 NFL Draft by the Washington Redskins but opted to sign with the newly formed Miami Dolphins of the American Football League, joining Tennessee teammate Frank Emanuel. Mitchell initially lived out of his car during training camp, expecting to be cut, and spent much of his rookie season on the taxi squad, playing in two games during the Dolphins' inaugural season. He made the team out of training camp the following year and rushed 83 times for 269 yards and three touchdowns and catching 18 passes for 133 yards and another touchdown. His four touchdowns tied for the team lead. Mitchell finished his professional career with 548 rushing yards and four touchdowns on 173 carries and 42 receptions for 533 yards and five touchdowns in 42 games played over five seasons.

References

1944 births
2012 deaths
Players of American football from Tennessee
Tennessee Volunteers football players
Miami Dolphins players
American football fullbacks
People from Sparta, Tennessee